This list of megamouth shark specimens and sightings includes recorded human encounters with Megachasma pelagios, popularly known as the megamouth shark. A similar list is published by the Ichthyology Department of the Florida Museum of Natural History at the University of Florida.

List of megamouth sharks

Records are listed chronologically in ascending order and numbered accordingly.

Date – Date on which the specimen was first captured, found, or observed.
Location – Area where the specimen was found.
Sex – Sex and sexual maturity of the specimen.
Size – Data relating to measurements. Abbreviations used are based on standardised acronyms in ichthyology (see Measurements).
Method of capture – Circumstances in which the specimen was recovered or observed.
Disposition – Repository or otherwise fate of the specimen.
References – Primary sources for each specimen as well as later publications that refer to the specimen.
Notes – Miscellaneous information.

Measurements
BD – body diameter.
PCL – precaudal length, also known as normal length. It is the length from the tip of the snout to the precaudal pit measured in a straight line.
TL – total length from the tip of the snout to the tip of the longer lobe of the caudal fin, usually measured with the lobes compressed along the midline. It is a straight line measure, not measured over the curve of the body.
WT – total mass of specimen.

References

[Anonymous] 1983a. New species of shark lacks sharp teeth. Syracuse Herald-Journal September 12, 1983.
[Anonymous] 1983b. Shark Seen As Evolution Clue. The New York Times September 13, 1983.
[Anonymous] 1983c. 'Lips' — new clue to evolution? The Chronicle Telegram September 13, 1983.
[Anonymous] 1983d. Wimp Kin Of 'Jaws' Discovered. The Miami Herald September 13, 1983.
[Anonymous] 1983e. Big-mouth shark an evolution key. The Daily Herald September 14, 1983.
[Anonymous] 1983f. Bizarre Sharks Come To Light. The New York Times October 25, 1983.
[Anonymous] 1984a. Bigmouth is vegetarian and very rare. The Chronicle Telegram November 30, 1984.
[Anonymous] 1984b. Rare Megamouth Shark Caught Off California. Lexington Herald-Leader December 6, 1984.
[Anonymous] 1988a. Shark With Luminescent Lips Washes Ashore Off Australia. St. Louis Post-Dispatch August 21, 1988.
[Anonymous] 1988b. International interest in megamouth. Western Australian Museum, Your Museum [September]:1–4.
[Anonymous] 1990a. Rare Shark Caught By California Fisherman. The Washington Post October 23, 1990.
[Anonymous] 1990b. Encounter With 'Alien Out Of The Depths': Scientists Set Megamouth Shark Free. San Jose Mercury News October 23, 1990.
[Anonymous] 1990c. Megamouth Shark Freed. The Atlanta Journal/The Atlanta Constitution October 23, 1990.
[Anonymous] 1990d. Divers And Shark. The Miami Herald October 24, 1990.
[Anonymous] 1991a. Megamouth Alive! Sea Frontiers 37(1): 21.
[Anonymous] 1991b. Megamouth Reveals a Phantom Shark's Realm. National Geographic 179(3): 136.
[Anonymous] 2002. South Africa: Mega Excitement Over Rare Shark Discovery. All Africa April 23, 2002.
[Anonymous] 2004. Rare shark dies on shore of Iloilo town; bewilders, awes townfolk. The Manila Bulletin Online.
[Anonymous] 2006. Rare shark dies in Bayawan. The Visayan Daily Star January 27, 2006.
[Anonymous] 2007. サメ希少種メガマウス水揚げ.  Sanriku Kahoku, July 18, 2007.
[Anonymous] 2011a. メガマウスザメ.  Ryukyu Asahi Broadcasting News Department, March 2, 2011.
[Anonymous] 2011b. お～きな口のサメ解剖　メガマウス、触れる標本に.  Ryūkyū Shimpō, March 3, 2011.
[Anonymous] 2011c. 世界的希少種「メガマウスザメ」の解剖を実施しました!  Okinawa Churaumi Aquarium, March 11, 2011.
Aca, E.Q. 2009. Megamouth Shark # 45: Megamouth shark in Whale Shark waters. Florida Museum of Natural History Ichthyology Department.
Amorim, A.F., L. Fagundes, C.A. Arfelli & F.E.S. Costa 1995. Occurrence of megamouth shark, Megachasma pelagios Taylor, Compagno & Struhsaker, 1983, in the Atlantic. VII Reunião do Grupo de Trabalho sobre pesca e pesquisa de tubarões e raias no Brasil. Rio Grande do Sul.
Amorim, A.F., C.A. Arfelli & J.I. Castro 2000. Description of a juvenile megamouth shark, Megachasma pelagios, caught off Brazil. Environmental Biology of Fishes 59(2): 117–123.
Bagarinao, T.U. 2004. Megamouth Shark #26 Stranded In Tigbauan, Iloilo, Philippines. Florida Museum of Natural History Ichthyology Department.
Baldo, M. & E.T. Elizaga 1998. Megamouth Shark #11. Florida Museum of Natural History Ichthyology Department.
Berra, T.M. & J.B. Hutchins 1988. Third Megamouth Shark, caught off Mandurah, Australia, August 18, 1988. Florida Museum of Natural History Ichthyology Department.
Berra, T.M. & J.B. Hutchins 1990. A specimen of megamouth shark, Megachasma pelagios (Megachasmidae) from Western Australia. Rec. West. Aust. Mus. 14(4): 651–656.
Berra, T.M. & J.B. Hutchins 1991. Natural history notes on the megamouth shark, Megachasma pelagios, from Western Australia. West. Aust. Nat. 18(8): 224–233.
Boonyapiwat, S. & C. Vidthayanon 2002. Megamouth Shark #16 Caught in East Indian Ocean. Florida Museum of Natural History Ichthyology Department.
Burgess, G. 2006. Megamouth Shark #37. Florida Museum of Natural History Ichthyology Department.
Burgess, G. N.d. Distribution Table of Confirmed Megamouth Shark Sightings. Florida Museum of Natural History Ichthyology Department.
Cabig, A. 2006. Megamouth Shark #35 Caught Off Of Barra, Macabalan, Cagayan de Oro City, Philippines. Florida Museum of Natural History Ichthyology Department.
Camacho, E.F. 2009. Megamouth Shark # 48: Rare Shark Specimen Captured, Only 47 Have Been Found Worldwide. Florida Museum of Natural History Ichthyology Department.
Castillo-Géniz, J.L. 2006. Megamouth Shark # 38: The First Megamouth Shark, Megachasma pelagios, Found in Mexican Waters. Florida Museum of Natural History Ichthyology Department.
Castro, J.I. 1994. Megamouth Shark #7 Caught in Fukuoka, Japan. Florida Museum of Natural History Ichthyology Department.
Castro, J.I. & O.B.F. Gadig 1995. Megamouth Shark #9 Caught off Brazil and now displayed in the Instituto de Pesca, São Paulo, Brazil. Florida Museum of Natural History Ichthyology Department.
Castro, J.I., E. Clark, K. Yano K. Nakaya 1997. The gross anatomy of the female reproductive tract and associated organs of the Fukuoka megamouth shark (Megachasma pelagios). In: Yano, K., J.F. Morrissey, Y. Yabumoto & K. Nakaya (eds.) Biology of the Megamouth Shark. Tokai University Press, Japan, pp. 115–119.
Clark, E. & J.I. Castro 1995. "Megamamma" is a virgin: dissection of the first female specimen of Megachasma pelagios. Environmental Biology of Fishes 43: 329–332.
Cressey, R. & H. Boyle 1978. A New Genus and Species of Parasitic Copepod (Pandaridae) from a Unique New Shark. Pacific Science 32(1): 25–30.
Dell'Amore, C. 2009. MEGAMOUTH SHARK PICTURE: Ultra-Rare Shark Found, Eaten. National Geographic News April 7, 2009.
Diamond, J.M. 1985. Filter-feeding on a grand scale. Nature 316: 679–680.
Dunford, B. 1976. Associated Press November 16, 1976.
Huge shark hauled from depths. Stevens Point Daily Journal November 17, 1976.
'Megamouth' is caught. Neenah-Menasha Northwestern November 17, 1976.
'Megamouth' Shark no Maneater. The Daily Times-News November 17, 1976.
Navy captures 'Megamouth'. The Advocate November 17, 1976.
New Species Of Shark. The Gettysburg Times November 17, 1976.
New Species Of Shark Caught Near Honolulu. The Daily Times November 17, 1976.
New Species Of Shark Under Study. Indiana County Gazette November 17, 1976.
New Type Of Shark Reported. Herald Times Reporter November 17, 1976.
Scientists say shark with a movie star mouth new species. The Chillicothe Constitution Tribune November 17, 1976.
Scientists snag new shark species. Walla Walla Union-Bulletin November 17, 1976.
A new species of shark is caught deep off Hawaii. The Modesto Bee November 18, 1976.
Big-mouthed shark caught, may be of unknown species. Winnipeg Free Press November 18, 1976.
Big-Mouth Shark May Be New Type. San Mateo Times November 18, 1976.
Unusual Shark Found Off Hawaii. The Washington Post November 18, 1976.
Huge new shark named 'Megamouth'. The Post Crescent November 20, 1976.
Experts believe shark is a new species. Great Bend Tribune November 28, 1976.
Elizaga, E.T. 1998a. Megamouth Shark in Cagayan de Oro. EcoNews March 18, 1998.
Elizaga, E.T. 1998b. The Capture of Megamouth 11. EcoNews May 29, 1998.
Elizaga, E.T. 2005a. Megamouth Shark 28. Elizaga.net.
Elizaga, E.T. 2005b. Megamouth Shark #28. Florida Museum of Natural History Ichthyology Department.
Ellorin, B.G. 2005. Megamouth shark found dead in Oro. Sun Star Cagayan de Oro January 31, 2005.
Falcón, E. 2011. Elusive megamouth shark snared in Mexico. Cosmos Online August 11, 2011.
Furuta, M. 2003. Personal communication. Florida Museum of Natural History Ichthyology Department.
Furuta, M. 2004. Megamouth Shark #25 Caught Off Ajiro, Shizuoka Japan. Florida Museum of Natural History Ichthyology Department. [Ajiro Newspaper article]
Furuta, M. 2005. Megamouth Shark #27 Captured In Purse Seine off Japan. Florida Museum of Natural History Ichthyology Department.
Gallagher, H. N.d. Megamouth Shark #1. Florida Museum of Natural History Ichthyology Department.
Gomes, U.L. & A. Buttigieg 2009. Megamouth Shark # 47: Megamouth . Florida Museum of Natural History Ichthyology Department.
Goto, M. 1999. Histological structure of the teeth, dermal and mucous denticles and gill rakers of a female megamouth shark, Megachasma pelagious, from Hakata Bay, Japan. Archives of Comparative Biology of Tooth Enamel 6: 9–18.
Haight, T. 1990a. Megamouth Shark #6 Caught in Dana Point, California. Florida Museum of Natural History Ichthyology Department.
Haight, T. 1990b. Male Megamouth Shark caught in Dana Point, California. Florida Museum of Natural History Ichthyology Department.
Ito, H., M. Yoshimoto & H. Somiya 1999. External Brain Form and Cranial Nerves of the Megamouth Shark, Megachasma pelagios. Copeia 1999(1): 210–213.
Johnson, C.S. 1978. Sea creatures and the problem of equipment damage. U.S. Naval Inst. Proc. [August]: 106–107.
Lavenberg, R.J. 1991. Megamania — the continuing saga of megamouth sharks. Terra 30: 30–39.
Lavenberg, R.J. & J.A. Seigel 1985. The Pacific's megamystery — Megamouth. Terra 23: 30–31.
Lima, L.M., B. Rennó & S. Siciliano 2009. Gigante dos mares em areias fluminenses. Diário do Grande ABC October 5, 2009.
Lin, V. 2005. Megamouth Shark #33. Florida Museum of Natural History Ichthyology Department.
Lin, V. 2006. Megamouth Shark #36 Caught in China Sea. Florida Museum of Natural History Ichthyology Department.
Lin, V. 2007. Megamouth Shark # 40: Megamouth Caught Off The Coast Of Japan . Florida Museum of Natural History Ichthyology Department.
Lin, V. 2009. Megamouth Shark # 46: Megamouth. Florida Museum of Natural History Ichthyology Department.
Lin, V. 2010a. Megamouth Shark # 49 Caught Off Of Southeastern China (Taiwan Straits). Florida Museum of Natural History Ichthyology Department.
Lin, V. 2010b. Megamouth Shark # 50 Caught Off Eastern Taiwan. Florida Museum of Natural History Ichthyology Department.
Lin, V. 2012. Megamouth Shark #54: Caught off eastern Taiwan. Florida Museum of Natural History Ichthyology Department.
Lumba Lumba Dive Centre 2004. Megamouth Shark #23 Washes Up in Sumatra, Indonesia. Florida Museum of Natural History Ichthyology Department.
Lumingkit, E., N. Gallentes & E.M. Largo 2005. Megamouth Shark #28. Florida Museum of Natural History Ichthyology Department.
Maisey, J.G. 1985. Relationships of the megamouth shark, Megachasma. Copeia 1985(1): 228–231.
Miya, M., M. Hirosawa & K. Mochizuki 1992. Occurrence of a megachasmid shark in Suruga Bay: photographic evidence. J. Nat. Hist. Must. Inst., Chiba 2: 41–44.
Mollet, H.F. 2004. Megamouth Shark #20. [translation of Japanese article by Victor Lin; reproduced by the Florida Museum of Natural History Ichthyology Department]
Mollet, H.F. 2012. Summary of Megamouth Sharks, Megachasma pelagios Taylor, Compagno & Struhsaker, 1983. Home Page of Henry F. Mollet, Research Affiliate, Moss Landing Marine Laboratories. [archived copy from April 16, 2009]
Morrissey, J.F. & E.T. Elizaga 1999. Capture of megamouth #11 in the Philippines. The Philippine Scientist 36: 143–147.
Nakaya, K. 1989a. Discovery of a megamouth shark from Japan. Japanese Journal of Ichthyology 36(1): 144–146.
Nakaya, K. 1989. Discovery of a megamouth shark from Japan. Rep. Japan. Soc. Elasmobranch Stud. 26: 36–39.
Nakaya, K., K. Yano, K. Takada & H. Hiruda 1997. Morphology of the first female megamouth shark, Megachasma pelagios (Elasmobranchii: Megachasmidae), landed at Fukuoka, Japan. In: Yano, K., J.F. Morrissey, Y. Yabumoto & K. Nakaya (eds.) Biology of the Megamouth Shark. Tokai University Press, Japan, pp. 51–62.
Nelson, D.R., J.N. McKibben, W.R. Strong Jr., C.G. Lowe, J.A. Sisneros, D.M. Schroeder & R.J. Lavenberg 1997. An acoustic tracking of a megamouth shark, Megachasma pelagios: a crepuscular vertical migrator. Environmental Biology of Fishes 49(4): 389–399.
Nielsen, J. 1988. A Mega Mystery: Reclusive giant shark has scientists guessing about the wonders of the deep. The Orange County Register October 12, 1988.
Osedo, H. 2004. Megamouth Is Bigger Than Jaws. The Courier-Mail April 23, 2004. [reproduced by the Florida Museum of Natural History Ichthyology Department]
Parco, B.A. 2007a. Hurt Megamouth Shark found near Cebu shore. Cebu Daily News May 30, 2007.
Parco, B.A. 2007b. Megamouth Shark # 39: Hurt Megamouth Shark found near Cebu shore. Cebu Daily News May 30, 2007. [reproduced by the Florida Museum of Natural History Ichthyology Department]
Pecchioni, P. & C. Benoldi 1999. Sperm Whales Spotted Attacking Megamouth Shark. Florida Museum of Natural History Ichthyology Department.
Petersen, D. 1999. Megamouth Shark #14 Caught off California. Florida Museum of Natural History Ichthyology Department.
Petersen, D. 2001. Megamouth Shark #15 Caught off California. Florida Museum of Natural History Ichthyology Department.
Reyes, L.S. 1998. Rare megamouth shark found. The Philippine Daily Inquirer 30 March 1998.
Robbins, G. 2003. Rare Shark Sighted Off Orange County, California. The Orange County Register May 27, 2003. [reproduced by the Florida Museum of Natural History Ichthyology Department]
Romero, M. & J.L.S. Cruz 2004. Megamouth Shark #22: Megamouth Caught for First Time in the Pacific Ocean off the Coast of South America. Florida Museum of Natural History Ichthyology Department.
Sala, I. 2006. Megamouth Shark #34. Florida Museum of Natural History Ichthyology Department.
Sanchez, C. 2002. Extremely rare Megamouth shark washes ashore in South Africa. Cyber Diver News Network April 21, 2002.
Séret, B. 1995. Première capture d'un requin grande gueule (Chondrichthyes, Megachasmidae) dans l'Atlantique, au large d'un Sénégal. [First record of a megamouth shark (Chondrichthyes, Megachasmidae) in the Atlantic Ocean, off Senegal.] Cybium 19(4): 425–427.
Smale, M. 2002. Megamouth Shark #17 Washed onto South African Beach. Florida Museum of Natural History Ichthyology Department.
Smale, M.J., L.J.V. Compagno & B.A Human 2002. First megamouth shark from the western Indian Ocean and South Africa. South African Journal of Science 98(7-8): 349–350.
Tajonera, I.J. 2009a. Megamouth Shark # 41: Megamouth Found Dead, Stranded On Beach In Hinunangan, Philippines. Florida Museum of Natural History Ichthyology Department.
Tajonera, I.J. 2009b. Megamouth Shark # 44: Megamouth Found Stranded Along The Hinunangan Shore In The Philippines. Florida Museum of Natural History Ichthyology Department.
Takada, K. 1994. Stranding of a megamouth shark in Hakata-Bay. Rep. Japan. Soc. Elasmobranch Stud. 31: 13–16.
Takada, K. 1995. Stranding of a megamouth shark (#7) in Hakata-Bay. Rep. Japan. Soc. Elasmobranch Stud. 32: 25.
Takada, K., H. Hiruda, S. Wakisaka, T. Mori & K. Nakaya 1997. Capture of the first female megamouth shark, Megachasma pelagios, from Hakata Bay, Fukuoka, Japan. In: Yano, K., J.F. Morrissey, Y. Yabumoto & K. Nakaya (eds.) Biology of the Megamouth Shark. Tokai University Press, Japan, pp. 3–9.
Tanaka, S. & K. Yano 1997. Histological observations on the reproductive organs of a female megamouth shark, Megachasma pelagios, from Hakata Bay, Japan. In: Yano, K., J.F. Morrissey, Y. Yabumoto & K. Nakaya (eds.) Biology of the Megamouth Shark. Tokai University Press, Japan, pp. 121–129.
Taylor, L. 1977. Megamouth. Oceans 10: 46–47.
Taylor, L.R., L.J.V. Compagno & P.J. Struhsaker 1983. Megamouth — a new species, genus, and family of lamnoid shark (Megachasma pelagios, family Megachasmidae) from the Hawaiian Islands. Proc. Calif. Acad. Sci. 43(8): 87–110.
Wang, J.Y. & S.-C. Yang 2005a. Megamouth Shark #29. Florida Museum of Natural History Ichthyology Department.
Wang, J.Y. & S.-C. Yang 2005b. Megamouth Shark #30. Florida Museum of Natural History Ichthyology Department.
Wang, J.Y. & S.-C. Yang 2005c. Megamouth Shark #31. Florida Museum of Natural History Ichthyology Department.
Wang, J.Y. & S.-C. Yang 2005d. Megamouth Shark #32. Florida Museum of Natural History Ichthyology Department.
White, W.T., M.A. Fahmi & K. Sumadhiharga 2004.   The Raffles Bulletin of Zoology 52(2): 603–607.
Wood, L. 1986. Megamouth: new species of shark. Sea Frontiers 32(3): 192–198.
Yabumoto, Y., M. Goto, K. Yano & T. Uyeno 1997. Dentition of a female megamouth, Megachasma pelagios, collected from Hakata Bay, Japan. In: Yano, K., J.F. Morrissey, Y. Yabumoto & K. Nakaya (eds.) Biology of the Megamouth Shark. Tokai University Press, Japan, pp. 63–75.
Yamaguchi, R. & K. Nakaya 1997. Fukuoka megamouth, a probable victim of the cookie-cutter shark. In: Yano, K., J.F. Morrissey, Y. Yabumoto & K. Nakaya (eds.) Biology of the Megamouth Shark. Tokai University Press, Japan, pp. 171–175.
Yano, K., M. Goto & Y. Yabumoto 1997a. Dermal and mucous denticles of a female megamouth shark, Megachasma pelagios, from Hakata Bay, Japan. In: Yano, K., J.F. Morrissey, Y. Yabumoto & K. Nakaya (eds.) Biology of the Megamouth Shark. Tokai University Press, Japan, pp. 77–91.
Yano, K., M. Toda, S. Uchida & F. Yasuzumi 1997b. Gross anatomy of the viscera and stomach contents of a megamouth shark, Megachasma pelagios, from Hakata Bay, Japan, with a comparison of the intestinal structure of other planktivorous elasmobranchs. In: Yano, K., J.F. Morrissey, Y. Yabumoto & K. Nakaya (eds.) Biology of the Megamouth Shark. Tokai University Press, Japan, pp. 105–113.
Yano, K., Y. Yabumoto, H. Ogawa, T. Hasegawa, K. Naganobu, S. Matumura, Y. Misuna & K. Matumura 1997c. X-ray observations on vertebrae and dentition of a megamouth shark, Megachasma pelagios, from Hakata Bay, Japan. In: Yano, K., J.F. Morrissey, Y. Yabumoto & K. Nakaya (eds.) Biology of the Megamouth Shark. Tokai University Press, Japan, pp. 21–29.
Yano, K., Y. Yabumoto, S. Tanaka, O. Tsukada & M. Furuta 1997d. Capture of a mature female megamouth shark, Megachasma pelagios, from Mie, Japan, pp. 335–349. In: Séret, B. & J.-Y. Sire (eds.) Proceedings of the 5th Indo-Pacific Fish Conference, Nouméa 1999. Soc. Fr. Ictyol., Paris.
Yano, K., O. Tsukada & M. Furuta 1998. Capture of megamouth shark number 12 from Atawa, Mie, Japan. Ichthyological Research 45(4): 424–426.
Yasay, E.B. 2003. Megamouth Shark #18 Caught for Second Time in Philippine Waters. Florida Museum of Natural History Ichthyology Department.

External links
Summary of Megamouth Sharks, Megachasma pelagios Taylor, Compagno & Struhsaker, 1983 [archived copy from April 16, 2009]

Distribution Table of Confirmed Megamouth Shark Sightings
List of Megamouth Shark Sightings at Sharkman's World

Sharks
Megamouth Shark